also known by his Chinese style name , was a bureaucrat of Ryukyu Kingdom.

Wakugawa was born to an aristocrat family called Shō-uji Wakugawa Dunchi; later, he became the eleventh head of this family, and was given Goeku magiri (modern part of Okinawa, Okinawa) as a hereditary fief. He was also a descendant of King Shō Sen'i.

Wakugawa was dispatched together with Prince Yuntanza Chōkō (also known by Yuntanza Chōken) in 1764 to celebrate Tokugawa Ieharu succeeded as shōgun of the Tokugawa shogunate. They sailed back in the next year.

He served as a member of sanshikan from 1765 to 1778. He put forward a proposal for the first statutory law in Ryukyuan history, together with his two colleagues, Miyahira Ryōtei and Yonabaru Ryōku, and the sessei Yuntanza Chōkō in 1775. This proposal was approved by King Shō Boku. The law was completed in 1786.

References

Ueekata
Sanshikan
People of the Ryukyu Kingdom
Ryukyuan people
1712 births
1785 deaths
18th-century Ryukyuan people